Luiz Carlos Guedes Stukas (born 10 March 1980), commonly known as just Luiz Carlos, is a Brazilian footballer who last played for Clube Atlético Bragantino.

Career
Luiz Carlos grew up in Porto Alegre, Brazil and began his career with Rio Branco at the age of 19 in 1999. After being with Rio Branco for six years in 2005, at age 25, he was bought by Juventude. After his impressive play for Juventude, he was bought by Portuguese team Paços de Ferreira. Since joining Paços, he has been a key figure for the club in defence, forming good partnerships with teammates, even adjusting his style of play to fit the style Paços plays in. He made his debut for Paços at home to CD Nacional in a 1–0 loss on 21 August 2005 when he came on as a substitute, playing only six minutes.

2006–07
Luiz Carlos played an important part in Paços de Ferreira's most successful year where he played 27 games out of a possible 30 and scored three goals. He formed a good partnership at centre back with Geraldo Alves and full backs Mangualde and Vitorino Antunes. With Luiz Carlos and his defence-partners forming the nucleus of the club, the 2006–07 season was their most successful in their history: they finished in sixth place and earned a berth in the UEFA Cup. On top of this, the club conceded only 36 goals. Luiz Carlos and his fellow defenders scored six goals, helping the team's cause.

2009/10
South China AA convener Steven Lo announced on 6 July 2009 that Luiz Carlos has joined South China AA for the 2009–10 Hong Kong First Division League and AFC Cup 2009 season. He signed for the Iranian club Paykan F.C. in 2010.

Career statistics

 Assist Goals

References

1980 births
Living people
Brazilian footballers
Brazilian expatriate footballers
Footballers from Porto Alegre
People from Rio Grande do Sul
South China AA players
Expatriate footballers in Hong Kong
Hong Kong First Division League players
Expatriate footballers in Iran
Paykan F.C. players
Brazilian expatriate sportspeople in Hong Kong
PAS Giannina F.C. players
Anagennisi Karditsa F.C. players
Expatriate footballers in Greece
Clube Atlético Bragantino players
Brazilian people of German descent
Association football central defenders